Karabulak may refer to:

Places
Karabulak, Azerbaijan, alternative name of several localities in Azerbaijan
Karabulak, Kazakhstan, an urban-type settlement in Kazakhstan
Karabulak (South Kazakhstan), a village in Kazakhstan
Kara-Bulak, several villages in Kyrgyzstan
Karabulak Urban Okrug, a municipal formation which the town of republic significance of Karabulak in the Republic of Ingushetia, Russia is incorporated as
Karabulak, Russia, several inhabited localities in Russia
 Karabulak Township, a township of Akqi County in Xinjiang Uygur Autonomous Region, China.
Karabulak, Kulp
Other
Karabulak, Russian name for a historical Nakh people, the Arshtins

See also
Karabulag, former name of the town of Shaghik, Armenia
Karabulag, until 1946, name of the town of Yernjatap, Armenia
Karabulag, until 1905, name of the town of Füzuli, Azerbaijan
Karabulag, alternative name of Qareh Bolagh, a village in East Azerbaijan Province, Iran
Qarabulaq (disambiguation)